Episcopal School of Acadiana (ESA) is a coeducational day school of the Episcopal Diocese of Western Louisiana for students in grades PreK-3 through 12. The Lower School, serving students in PreK-3 through fifth grades, is located in Lafayette, Louisiana. The Middle and Upper School campus, for students in sixth through twelfth grades, is located in Cade, Louisiana, between Lafayette and New Iberia. ESA draws students from throughout the Greater Lafayette area. The school is accredited by the Independent Schools Association of the Southwest. The address is 1557 Smede Hwy. Broussard, LA 70518

History 

In August of 1979, eleven teachers and 87 students met in the basement of the First Baptist Church in Lafayette, Louisiana and established the Middle and Upper Schools of The Episcopal School of Acadiana. ESA’s founders believed the founding of the school should focus on three key areas: becoming the best academic program in the Acadiana area; an institution built on the history and traditions of the Christian church; and a solid athletic program with intramural and varsity teams.

Affiliations 
The school is a member of several local, regional, and national educational and religious associations.

Athletics
Episcopal School of Acadiana athletics competes in the Louisiana High School Athletic Association (LHSAA) in the "B" classification (schools without a football program).

ESA supports several sports including cross-country, boys' and girls' soccer, boys' basketball, baseball, swimming, track and field, and boys' and girls' tennis.

The school has won the Class B Ford Cup for the most outstanding athletics in the state of Louisiana for 11 years in a row.

Championships
Volleyball Championships
The girls' volleyball team holds a national record of 16 consecutive state championships.  

Rugby Championships
The school also has a non-LHSAA mandated rugby football club, which won two state championship titles in 2006 and 2009.

Notable people
Kris Cox, a professional golfer, graduated from ESA.
Preston Robinson, Chief of Staff to U.S. Senator Kennedy, graduated from ESA.
 Chanda Rubin, Professional tennis player graduated from ESA in 1993.

References

External links
 Official site

Private high schools in Louisiana
Schools in Lafayette Parish, Louisiana
Private middle schools in Louisiana
Private elementary schools in Louisiana
Episcopal schools in the United States
Independent Schools Association of the Southwest